IS 456-2000 Plain and Reinforced Concrete - Code of Practice is an Indian Standard code of practice for general structural use of plain and reinforced concrete. The latest revision of this standard was done in year 2000, and reaffirmed 2021. This code uses the limit state design approach as well as the working stress design approach. However the Code recommends use of the limit state design approach.  It is written for use in India. It gives extensive information on the various aspects of concrete.

It contains five sections and eight annexes:
 Section 1: General
 Section 2: Materials, workmanship, inspection and testing
 Section 3: General design considerations
 Section 4: Special design requirements for structural members and systems
 Section 5: Structural design (limit state method)

The structural practice handbook SP:16-1980 Design Aids for Reinforced Concrete to IS:456-1978 has tables and charts that help structural engineers to design simple sections rapidly. Even though the design aid is based on the 1978 code, it continues to be used without revision as there have been no major changes to Section 5, on which the design aid is based.

The IS 456:2000 code must be read along with other Indian standard codes which supplement it:
 IS:13920-2016 Ductile Detailing of Reinforced Concrete Structures subjected to Seismic Forces - Code of Practice
 SP:34-1987 Handbook on Concrete Reinforcement and Detailing (This handbook needs to be revised based on the changes to the detailing clauses of IS:456-2000)

References

External links
IS 456:2000

Standards of India
Building materials